Fatima Faloye(born in Harlem, New York City), is of Nigerian and Barbadian descent and studied at Dalton School in New York City as well as New York University.  Faloye won the coveted NAACP Image Award for Outstanding Supporting Actress in a Drama Series in 1996 for her role as Chantel Tierney in New York Undercover.  Faloye has also had small roles in the long-running series Law & Order.  She has also worked on several short independent films as a producer and is studying to move into the director's chair. Her cousin, Christian Faloye is the Hip Hop recording artist known as Ilacoin.

References

External links

1972 births
Living people
American people of Yoruba descent
American people of Nigerian descent
American people of Barbadian descent
Actresses from New York City
New York University alumni
Yoruba actresses
American television actresses
Nigerian actresses
21st-century American women